Uludere is a town and the seat of the Uludere District in the Şırnak Province of Turkey. The town is populated by Kurds of the Goyan tribe and had a population of 12,491 in 2021.

Its mayor is Sait Ürek from the party AKP.

Neighborhoods 
Uludere is divided into the seven neighborhoods of Bulakbaşı, Gündoğdu, Kılaban, Küçükçay, Ödül, Özelli and Yeşilova.

References

Populated places in Şırnak Province
Kurdish settlements in Şırnak Province